Jacob Willemszoon Delff the Elder, (c. 1550 in Gouda5 May 1601 in Delft) was a portrait painter active in Delft. He is known by a picture of an 'Archery-feast' in the Hotel de Ville at Delft, dated 1592; and by a Reconciliation of Esau and Jacob, in the Belvedere at Vienna, bearing the date 1584. He also painted The Sportsman's Dinner, and a portrait group of his family. His works display good conception and execution, but are somewhat heavy in colouring.

Jacob Delff had three sons, Cornelis, Rochus, and Willem. Cornelis Jacobsz Delff (Gouda c. 1571-15 August 1643, Delft), was a pupil of his father and of Cornelis van Haarlem, and distinguished himself by very fine pictures of still life. Rochus Delff was a portrait painter, and a pupil of his father.

References

Sources

External links
    
Vermeer and The Delft School, a full text exhibition catalog from The Metropolitan Museum of Art, which has material on Jacob Willemsz Delff

1550s births
1601 deaths
Dutch Renaissance painters
People from Gouda, South Holland
Artists from Delft